The William Allen White Children's Book Award is a set of two annual awards for books selected by vote of Kansas schoolchildren from lists prepared by committee. As a single award it was established in 1952 by Ruth Garver Gagliardo, a children's literature specialist at Emporia State University, which continues to direct the program. It is named for William Allen White (1868–1944), long-time publisher and editor of The Emporia Gazette. The White Award is the oldest statewide children's choice book award in the United States.

From 2001, two winners have been chosen each year, one by students in grades 3 to 5 and one by students in grades 6 to 8, from separate lists of books. The award website includes an archive of annual Master Lists that is complete back to the list of 18 books for school year 1952–53. Curriculum Guides "designed to be used in teaching or preparing instructional units" are prepared for books on the year's Master List and some past Guides are available.

Currently (as of October 2019), the annual celebration at Emporia early in October includes a Friday evening "Read-Ins and Sleepovers" with space for 100 people. After Saturday morning activities, student representatives present medals to the winning writers at the Awards Ceremony. Travel to Emporia is an incentive in some classroom reading programs. At least once (2011), a writer declined because of a conflict on the celebration date and was replaced as the White Award winner.

Recipients 1953–2000 

There were 49 winners of the single William Allen White Book Children's Book Award in its 48 years through 2000, with two winners in 1974.

Recipients 2001–2020

Notelist

References

External links
 Recruitment and instruction of the Master List selection committee
William Allen White Children's Book Award homepage

American children's literary awards
Awards established in 1953
1953 establishments in Kansas
Kansas culture
Kansas education-related lists
Emporia State University